See also the independent record label imprint of the same name, lowercase people records.
lowercase people is an organization that is divided into three major divisions: The lp Online Magazine, lp apparel, and the lowercase people Justice Fund. The organization was founded by the alternative rock band Switchfoot. In late October 2007, the band announced on their YouTube account page that they had created "lp records" to help further the vision of lowercase people.

The lp Online Magazine was started in 2005. It serves to bring attention to notable works created by artists, writers, and musicians, and to introduce social issues worldwide. The magazine is released quarterly. Lowercase people apparel gathers the works of artists. They are sold as shirts, prints, stickers, and buttons. All profits go towards the Lowercase people Justice Fund. In partnership with Geneva Global, the Lowercase people Justice Fund, a non-profit organization, uses the money gained from the shirts and prints sold to aid Third World communities.

An example is their involvement with the Kuyasa Kids, which is a choir in Africa that is made up of kids who were orphaned by HIV/AIDS. Switchfoot has helped them to create a CD which is also sold through Lowercase people. The proceeds will go towards the children's education. Jon Foreman also wrote "The Shadow Proves the Sunshine" in reaction to their work with the Kuyasa Kids. Lowercase people have also collected donations with The Salvation Army for Hurricane Katrina victims. Tim Foreman explains:

"As a rock band, we're not overly idealistic about single-handedly changing the world, but we do know that people are listening to what we have to say ... so we want to use what platform we have been given to make a difference."

"We are humanity: beautiful and broken. We want to collide. We're curious. We're thinking out loud. We are the lowercase people. Join us as we dream."
-Chad Butler

Issues

Issue 1

Music:
Feature: Switchfoot vs. Reeve Oliver
Reviews: The Fray's How to Save a Life, Aloha's Here Comes Everyone, Common's Be, and The Futureheads' self-titled album
Bands: Reeve Oliver
Art:
Feature: Art As Play
Fine Artists: Jeremey Wright
Graphic Artists: Nessim Higson
Words:
Feature: A Love Supreme: The Spiritual Life of John Coltrane
Interview: David Dark and Chris Ahrens
Regulars: Dark Matter: Are You Reality-Based?, and Reasonable Doubts: The Heart of Man
Profiles: David Dark, Chris Ahrens, and Charlie Peacock
Justice:
Feature: Out Of South Africa: Random Thoughts in flight
Community: Kayamandi, South Africa
The Lowercase people Justice Fund
Get Involved: Kuyasa Kids' Live in Kayamandi CD

Issue 2

Music:
Feature: Ryan O'Neal and Ron Sexsmith
Reviews: Circa Survive's Juturna, Richard Swift's The Novelist Secretly Canadian, Sufjan Stevens' Illinois Asthmatic Kitty, and The Rakes' Capture/Release
Bands: Ron Sexsmith and Sleeping at Last
Art:
Feature: Lain York and J Todd Greene   
Fine Artists: Lain York and J Todd Greene
Graphic Artists: Jeff Kleinsmith
Words:
Feature: Between Memory and Mobility
Interview: George Plimpton and Ernest Hemingway
Regulars: Dark Matter: Getting In on the Act or How to Never Feel Uncool Again, and Reasonable Doubts: The Sea Hags
Profiles: Booker Browning, and Cameron Bird
Justice:
Feature: Anonymous in India: A travelogue
Community: India
The Lowercase people Justice Fund
Get Involved: Donations

Issue 3

Music:
Feature: A Conversation between Mutemath and Mae
Reviews: Sharon Jones's Naturally, Willie Nile's Streets of New York, Jamie Lidell's Multiply, Cat Power's The Greatest, and Angels & Airwaves' We Don't Need to Whisper
Bands: Mae and Mutemath
Art:
Feature: A Conversation between Bobby Bailey and Jeremy Dean
Fine Artists: Jeremy Dean and Bobby Bailey
Graphic Artists: Bill Caywood
Words:
Feature: Where Truth Meets Traction
Interview: John Brown’s War on Terror
Regulars: Dark Matter: Everybody to the Limit, and Reasonable Doubts: Dodo Does Hollywood
Profiles: Won Kim
Justice:
Feature: Four Days in New Rwanda
Community: Rwanda, Africa
The Lowercase people Justice Fund
Get Involved: Buy A T-shirt, Donations, Reach Out (Invisible Children, Blood:Water Mission, International Justice Mission, Dalit Freedom Network)

Trivia

 The name of the organization is taken from Switchfoot's song, Company Car, in the lines "Now I'm down, under the pavement/ Of Capital Hills and Lowercase people".

References

External links
Lowercase people official website
Lowercase people Records future official website

Magazines established in 2005
Online music magazines published in the United States
Quarterly magazines published in the United States
Switchfoot